Richard Langford was a Welsh Anglican priest in the late 17th and early 18th centuries.

Langford was  born in Llanfwrog, Denbighshire and educated at St Alban Hall, Oxford. He held livings at Penmorfa, Bosbury, Llanrhaeadr-ym-Mochnant and Goodrich.  Langford was appointed Archdeacon of Merioneth in 1716.

Notes

17th-century Welsh Anglican priests
18th-century Welsh Anglican priests
Archdeacons of Merioneth
Alumni of the University of Oxford